WATV-LD (channel 47) is a low-power television station in Orlando, Florida, United States, owned by HC2 Holdings. Its transmitter is located near Bithlo, Florida.

Subchannels
The station's digital signal is multiplexed:

WATV-LD previously carried CNN Latino in the 47.1 channel position until February 2014, when it was announced that that network would cease operations.

On December 31, 2022, Azteca América ceased operations.

References

External links

ATV-LD
Low-power television stations in the United States
ATV-LD
Innovate Corp.
Classic Reruns TV affiliates